Playa Flamenca is a locality and beach,  south of the town of Torrevieja in the municipality of Orihuela in the Province of Alicante, eastern Spain. The market at Playa Flamenca sells a range of items from shoes, clothing, belts and purses to vegetables.

References

External links 
The complete area guide for Playa Flamenca

http://www.PlayaFlamenca.com

Populated places in the Province of Alicante
Geography of the Province of Alicante
Beaches of the Valencian Community